Martyn Bell (born 17 July 1964) is an auto racing driver. Since 2006 he has contested the British Touring Car Championship, but he spent the majority of his career racing BMWs in various championships. He won one overall title and 3 class titles in his 9 years of driving BMWs for Geoff Steel (himself a former BTCC racer) and was the first person to campaign a BMW E46 in the UK.

In 2006 he and Steel moved into the British Touring Car Championship in a 320i. He returned for the 2007 BTCC season with the same car under the team allaboutproperty.com Team banner. In 2008 he teamed up with fellow BTCC racer Erkut Kızılırmak with two former works Vauxhall Astra Sports Hatch for Team Arkas Racing with Tech-Speed Motorsport. He competed in the 2009 championship in a two-car Tech-Speed Motorsport outfit, alongside Paul O'Neill.

Bell took a sabbatical from motorsport for 2010 due to a hip injury he sustained during the previous year.

Personal
He currently lives in South Ferriby, a hamlet 3 miles outside Barrow upon Humber. 

Martyn is a popular figure who always has time for his fans. He works hard for his Sponsors, taking the BMW to events and exhibitions all over the UK and Europe. When not racing he is involved in his local community supporting many local events. Martyn has trained as a Motor Sport Marshal and can sometimes be found at Cadwell Park Circuit putting something back into the Sport. He is an accomplished public speaker.

Racing record

Career summary

Complete British Touring Car Championship results
(key) (Races in bold indicate pole position - 1 point awarded in first race) (Races in italics indicate fastest lap - 1 point awarded all races) (* signifies that driver lead race for at least one lap - 1 point awarded all races)

References

External links
Martyn Bell Racing
Geoff Steel Racing
Official BTCC Website
Profile at BTCCPages.com

British Touring Car Championship drivers
Living people
1964 births
People from Barrow upon Humber